M.O.R. is the official sixth studio album by Alabama 3. It was released on 9 September 2007.

Track listing 
All tracks composed by Alabama 3; except where noted.
 "Check In" - 1:21
 "Fly" - 3:48
 featuring Devlin Love
 "Lockdown" (Nick Reynolds) - 4:12
 "Monday Don't Mean Anything" - 4:09
 featuring Errol T
 "Amos Moses" (Jerry Reed) - 4:51
 "Are You a Souljah?" (Steve Finnerty) - 6:07
 featuring Nam/Rev. B. Atwell
 "The Klan" (Alan Grey, David Grey) - 5:11
 featuring Brian Jackson/MC Pablo
 "Hooked" - 4:43
 "The Doghouse Chronicles" - 2:09
 "The Middle of the Road" (Cameron Blackwood, Matthew Racher) - 3:32
 "Work It (All Night Long)" - 3:22
 featuring The Lenin of Love
 "Way Beyond the Blues" - 4:18
 "Holy Blood" - 5:18
 featuring The Kings of Kaos
 "Sweet Joy" (Charlie Reid, Craig Reid) - 10:04
 featuring The Proclaimers/Michael Wojas

References

2007 albums
Alabama 3 albums
One Little Independent Records albums